Ichneutica oliveri is a moth of the family Noctuidae. It is endemic to New Zealand, found only in the South Island. However it has not been observed on the eastern side of that island from mid-Canterbury southwards to Southland. This species is distinctive and is unlikely to be confused with other closely related species. It inhabits tussock grasslands, shrubland as well as granite sand plains, all in the alpine zone. Adults are on the wing from December to March and are attracted to light. They have been observed feeding on the flowers of Hebe species. The life history of this species is unknown as are the larval hosts.

Taxonomy 

I. oliveri was first described by George Hampson in 1911 using a single female specimen collected at Bold Peak in the Humboldt Range by F. S. Oliver. The holotype specimen is held at the Natural History Museum, London. George Hudson described the species in his 1928 publication The butterflies and moths of New Zealand under the name Melanchra oliveri. In 1988, in his catalogue of New Zealand Lepidoptera, J. S. Dugdale placed this species within the genus Graphania. In 2019 Robert Hoare undertook a major review of New Zealand Noctuidae. During this review the genus Ichneutica was greatly expanded and the genus Graphania was subsumed into that genus as a synonym. As a result of this review, this species is now known as Ichneutica oliveri.

Description 

Hampson described this species as follows:
I. oliveri is a distinctive moth, unlikely to be confused with other species. The male has a wingspan of between 38 and 40 mm and the female of between 42 and 46 mm.

Distribution 
This species is endemic to New Zealand. It is found only in the South Island, however this species has not been observed on the east side of that island from mid-Canterbury down to Southland.

Habitat 
This species prefers to inhabit tussock grasslands and shrubland in the alpine zone. This species also inhabits granite sand plains, a rare ecosystem in New Zealand, again in the alpine zone.

Behaviour 
Adults of this species are on the wing from December to March. This species is drawn to light.

Life history and host species 
The life history of this species is unknown as are the host species of the larvae. Adults have been observed feeding from flowers of Hebe species during the evening.

References

Moths described in 1911
Hadeninae
Moths of New Zealand
Endemic fauna of New Zealand
Taxa named by George Hampson
Endemic moths of New Zealand